The Battle of Guadalupe Island, also known as the Battle of Guadalupe, was a naval action that took place off Guadalupe Island (French: Guadeloupe), Caribbean Sea, on 8 November 1595, between a Spanish force of five frigates commanded by Don Pedro Tello de Guzmán and Don Gonzalo Méndez de Cancio (who was appointed Admiral on 19 August 1595), and an English squadron of nine ships (rear of Francis Drake's fleet), during the unsuccessful English military expedition of 1595 against Spain and their possessions, led by Sir Francis Drake himself, Sir John Hawkins and Sir Thomas Baskerville, as the context of the Anglo-Spanish War (1585–1604). The result was a Spanish victory. One of the English ships, the Francis, was captured and the others fled from the battle. Then, knowing Drake's plans, the Spanish flotilla took advantage over the bulk of Drake's fleet, and arrived at San Juan on 13 November,  reinforcing the town with 500 soldiers and supplies. The Spaniards organized different artillery positions in strategic locations, and the five frigates were positioned to cover the entrance of the bay with their artillery, awaiting the arrival of Drake. On 22 November, with the defenses completed, the English fleet arrived off San Juan and tried to invade the town. The result was another Spanish victory over Drake's forces.

See also
 Spanish Main
 Battle of Las Palmas
 Battle of San Juan (1595)
 Guadalupe Island
 Fort San Felipe del Morro

Notes

References
 Fernández Duro, Cesáreo (1898). Armada Española desde la unión de los reinos de Castilla y Aragón. Vol. III. Instituto de Historia y Cultura Naval. Madrid. 
 Konstam, Angus (2008). Piracy: The Complete History. Oxford: Osprey Publishing. UK. 
 Van Middeldyk, R. A. (2008). The History of Puerto Rico. Teddington: Echo Library. UK. 
 Ullivarri, Saturnino (2004). Piratas y corsarios en Cuba. Spain: Editorial Renacimiento.  
 Rodríguez González, Agustín Ramón (2006). Victorias por Mar de los Españoles. Biblioteca de Historia. Grafite Ediciones. Madrid.

External links
 Fernández Duro, Cesáreo (1898). Armada Española desde la unión de los reinos de Castilla y Aragón. Vol. III. Instituto de Historia y Cultura Naval. Madrid. 

Naval battles of the Anglo-Spanish War (1585–1604)
Conflicts in 1595
16th century in the Caribbean
1595 in the Caribbean
1595 in the British Empire
1595 in the Spanish Empire